Billycock Hill is a rounded, ice-covered hill in Antarctica, which rises to  and projects  above the surrounding ice sheet. It is situated close north of the head of Neny Glacier on the west coast of Graham Land. First surveyed by the United States Antarctic Service, 1939–41, it was re-surveyed in 1946 by the Falkland Islands Dependencies Survey, and named by them for its resemblance to a billycock hat.

References
 

Hills of Graham Land
Fallières Coast